Robert John Gracie  (November 8, 1910 – August 3, 1963) was a Canadian professional ice hockey centreman who played ten seasons in the National Hockey League for the Toronto Maple Leafs, Boston Bruins, New York Americans, Montreal Maroons, Montreal Canadiens and Chicago Blackhawks.

Playing career

Toronto Maple Leafs
The North Bay, Ontario native came out of the Toronto junior hockey ranks, eventually signing on as a free agent with Conn Smythe's Toronto Maple Leafs. Gracie made the jump from the OHA's Toronto Marlboros and appeared in eight games for the Leafs in the 1930–31 NHL season registering four goals and two assists for six points. The following season Gracie appeared in all forty eight regular season games for the Maple Leafs and all seven post-season contests. Playing on a line with Frank Finnigan and Harold Darragh he helped Toronto win a Stanley Cup in their first season at Maple Leaf Gardens, sweeping the New York Rangers in the Stanley Cup Final three games to none in the best-of-five series. Gracie would once again appear in all forty eight regular season games the following year with the Leafs, helping them back to the Stanley Cup final in 1932–33, where they faced off against New York once again, only to see the Rangers prevail in the final series three games to one.

Boston Bruins and New York Americans
Gracie's time with Toronto came to an end after being traded to the Ottawa Senators for Hec Kilrea before the start of the 1933–34 season. Ottawa in turn, immediately dealt him the same day to the Boston Bruins for Percy Galbraith, Bud Cook and Teddy Saunders. Gracie played the first 24 games of the season for the Bruins before being traded again, this time to the New York Americans. He played the remaining 24 games for New York appearing in all 48 games of the regular season for the third consecutive year.

Montreal Maroons
After stints in Boston and New York, Gracie found himself back in Canada after his rights were sold to the Montreal Maroons. Maroons' general manager and coach Tommy Gorman put him on a line with newly acquired Gus Marker and sophomore left winger Herb Cain, to form what would later be dubbed the "Green Line." Gracie won the second Stanley Cup of his career in his first season with the Maroons in 1934–35.

Montreal Canadiens and Chicago Blackhawks
Before the start of the 1938–39 NHL season Gracie was sold to the Canadiens but would only play seven games  
that year for Montreal when the Chicago Blackhawks purchased his rights. He would split the remainder of the season with Chicago and the Cleveland Barons of the IAHL.

Minor leagues
In 1944–45, while playing for the Pittsburgh Hornets, Gracie led the American Hockey League in scoring with 95 points, tying for the lead with teammate Bob Walton.

Awards and achievements
 1931–32 - Stanley Cup Champion - Toronto Maple Leafs
 1934–35 - Stanley Cup Champion - Montreal Maroons
 1944–45 - AHL Scoring Leader (tied with teammate Bob Walton) - Pittsburgh Hornets

Career statistics

Regular season and playoffs

Transactions
 Signed as a free agent by the Toronto Maple Leafs, February 27, 1931.
 Traded by the Toronto Maple Leafs to the Ottawa Senators for Hec Kilrea and cash, October 4, 1933.
 Traded by the Ottawa Senators to the Boston Bruins for Percy Galbraith, Bud Cook and Ted Saunders, October 4, 1933.
 Traded by the Boston Bruins with Art Chapman to the New York Americans for Lloyd Gross and George Patterson, January 11, 1934.
 Sold by the New York Americans to the Montreal Maroons, December 25, 1934.
 Sold by the Montreal Maroons to the Montreal Canadiens, September 14, 1938.
 Sold by the Montreal Canadiens to the Chicago Blackhawks, November 25, 1938.

External links

1910 births
1963 deaths
Boston Bruins players
Buffalo Bisons (AHL) players
Canadian ice hockey centres
Chicago Blackhawks players
Hershey Bears players
Sportspeople from North Bay, Ontario
Montreal Canadiens players
Montreal Maroons players
New York Americans players
Pittsburgh Hornets players
Stanley Cup champions
Toronto Maple Leafs players
Toronto Marlboros players
Washington Lions players
Ice hockey people from Ontario
Canadian expatriate ice hockey players in the United States